Albert Schatz (1839–1910) was a musicologist, composer, and librettist.

1839 births
1910 deaths
German musicologists
German composers
19th-century German musicians